Café Band Sportif, commonly known as Café Sportif, is an Equatoguinean football club based in Malabo that plays in the Equatoguinean Second Division. 

In 1996 the team has won Equatoguinean Premier League.

Achievements
Equatoguinean Premier League: 1
1996

Performance in CAF competitions
CAF Champions League: 1 appearance
1997 CAF Champions League – First Round

External links

References

Football clubs in Equatorial Guinea
Sport in Malabo